Joseph Lyman (birth unknown – death unknown) was a professional rugby league footballer who played in the 1910s, 1920s and 1930s, and coached in the 1930s. He played at club level for Featherstone Rovers (who were a "junior" club at the time, so a Heritage № has not been allocated), and Dewsbury (captain from the 1925–26 season), a goal-kicker, initially in the backs, and later as a forward (prior to the specialist positions of), including , i.e. number 13, during the era of contested scrums, and coached at club level for Batley and Dewsbury.

Playing career

Challenge Cup Final appearances
Joe Lyman played , and was captain in Dewsbury's 2–13 defeat by Wigan in the 1929 Challenge Cup Final during the 1928–29 season at Wembley Stadium, London on Saturday 4 May 1929, in front of a crowd of 41,000.

Career records
Joe Lyman holds Dewsbury's "Most Career Appearances" record with 454 appearances, and "Most Career Tries" record with 144 tries.

Coaching career

Club career
Joe Lyman was the coach of Batley from July 1931 to November 1934.

Genealogical information
Joe Lyman was the brother of the rugby league footballer who played for Batley; James "Jim" Lyman

References

External links
Search for "Lyman" at rugbyleagueproject.org
Search for "Joseph Lyman" at britishnewspaperarchive.co.uk
Search for "Joe Lyman" at britishnewspaperarchive.co.uk

Batley Bulldogs coaches
Dewsbury Rams captains
Dewsbury Rams coaches
Dewsbury Rams players
English rugby league players
Featherstone Rovers players
Place of birth missing
Place of death missing
Rugby league coaches
Rugby league forwards
Rugby league locks
Rugby league utility players
Year of birth missing
Year of death missing